Bathycrinidae is a family of echinoderms in the class Crinoidea. It contains the following genera and species:

 Bathycrinus Wyville Thomson, 1872
 Bathycrinus aldrichianus Wyville Thomson, 1877
 Bathycrinus australis AH Clark, 1907
 Bathycrinus australocrucis McKnight, 1973
 Bathycrinus carpenterii (Danielssen & Koren, 1877)
 Bathycrinus gracilis Wyville Thomson, 1877
 Bathycrinus mendeleevi Mironov, 2008
 Discolocrinus Mironov, 2008
 Discolocrinus thieli Mironov, 2008
 Monachocrinus AH Clark, 1919
 Monachocrinus aotearoa McKnight, 1973
 Monachocrinus caribbeus (AH Clark, 1908)
 Monachocrinus mortenseni Gislén, 1938
 Monachocrinus paradoxus (AH Clark, 1909)
 Monachocrinus recuperatus (Perrier, 1885)
 Monachocrinus sexradiatus AH Clark, 1919
 Naumachocrinus 
 Naumachocrinus hawaiiensis AH Clark, 1973

References 

Bourgueticrinida
Echinoderm families